"Unconverted long-term prisoners" is the North Korean term for northern loyalists imprisoned in South Korea who never renounced Juche. The North Korean government considers them to be "pro-reunification patriotic fighters", while South Korean scholars have described them as "pro-communist spies".

History
In March 1998, South Korean president Kim Dae-jung declared an amnesty for long-term prisoners over the age of 70, as well as some suffering from disease. In February 1999, President Kim declared another amnesty for 17 unconverted long-term prisoners. In 2000, as part of the June 15th North–South Joint Declaration, sixty-three of the prisoners were permitted to settle in North Korea. There were hopes that North Korea would reciprocate by releasing Southern prisoners of war still detained in the North. A number of them left behind family members in the South; the South's Ministry of Unification refused permission to let the family members go north with them. They crossed the border by bus through the truce village of Panmunjom at 10 AM on 2 September 2000, while a group of Southern protesters decried their return and demanded that the North return abducted Southerners; they were welcomed on the Northern side by a reception with a brass band playing revolutionary songs, and each was later awarded the National Reunification Prize.

In literature and film
A book about their experiences was published in North Korea in 2001. In 2003, South Korean director Kim Dong-won released Repatriation, a documentary about the unconverted prisoners, based on more than 12 years and 800 hours of filming.

List of prisoners who crossed over to North Korea in 2000
Following is a list of the 63 prisoners who went to North Korea in 2000.

Personal names are given in McCune–Reischauer romanisation of the Northern spelling (thus surnames are spelled Ri instead of Yi, Ryu instead of Yu, etc.); place names are given in McCune–Reischauer without diacritics for places now in North Korea, and Revised Romanisation for places now in South Korea.

See also
 Americans in North Korea
 Cuban Five
 North Korean abductions of Japanese citizens

References

Prisoners and detainees of South Korea
Recipients of the National Reunification Prize
North Korea–South Korea relations